Mayuka may refer to

Mayuka Nomura (born 1989), Japanese voice actress
Mayuka Thaïs (born 1979), American singer-songwriter, artist, voice over artist and art educator
, Japanese swimmer
Mayuka, a character from the manga series  Tenchi Muyo!
Emmanuel Mayuka (born 1990), Zambian football striker 

Japanese feminine given names